Maoricicada hamiltoni, also known as the Hamilton's cicada, is a species of insect that is endemic to New Zealand. This species was first described by John Golding Myers in 1926. This species is named in honour of Harold Hamilton.

References

Cicadas of New Zealand
Insects described in 1926
Endemic fauna of New Zealand
Cicadettini
Endemic insects of New Zealand